Big Brown Box was an online retailer of audio visual products, based in Sydney, Australia. It was a subsidiary of Winning Appliances and Appliances Online until 2015 when it was merged with Appliances Online.

History 
An online retail site trading as Big Brown Box was launched by Thorn Group Limited (owners of brands including Radio Rentals and Rentlo) in November 2008. It offered whitegoods, small appliances and electronic products.

The site allowed customers to order goods online with Radio Rentals stores facilitating delivery and service of the goods.

At the time, company leaders were confident of its success in the competitive online market, but made it clear they were not pursuing a discounting war strategy, and would take a "sensible and easy approach".

In November 2009, the ASX announcement from Thorn Group Limited noted that the BigBrownBox.com.au strategy was "gaining impetus".

In the same report, Thorn Group Managing Director, John Hughes, was quoted as saying: "Big Brown Box is really starting to gain some momentum and it is great to see a good steady increase in sales together with very positive customer feedback, particularly from those people in regional areas."

The site had reached more than 800,000 visits by August 2009.

Big Brown Box's eBay store was launched in July 2010, and Big Brown Box recorded a score of five out of five star ratings for all eBay seller rating categories (Item Description, Communication, Postage time, and Postage and Handling Charges). It also received a 98.7 per cent positive feedback rating.

In November 2010, the Thorn Group announced it would exit the online venture BigBrownBox.com.au in early 2011 due to difficult trading conditions and the poor state of the retail market.

A statement on the Australian Securities Exchange said the group expected minimal impact on profitability for FY11 and there was potential for far better returns from an alternative investment.

John Hughes told Retailbiz the move was in the best interest of shareholders.

The strength of the Australian Dollar, leading to price deflation, aggressive price competition and softening consumer demand were also identified as reasons for the closure. The move was completed by March 2011.

John Winning, CEO of white goods retailer Appliances Online, purchased the digital asset for Big Brown Box.

Big Brown Box was part of the National Associated Retail Traders of Australia (NARTA) group.

In 2015 owing to the significant customer crossover between the Appliances Online and Big Brown Box businesses the two businesses were merged, and Big Brown Box redirecting to Appliances Online's site.

Awards 
Power Retail award for Best Site Design, Online Retailer Industry Awards 2010.

References

External links 
 * Big Brown Box blog
 Appliances Online
 Winning Appliances

Companies based in Sydney
Online retailers of Australia
Retail companies established in 2008
Privately held companies of Australia